The 2017 Indoor Football League season was the ninth season of the Indoor Football League (IFL). Playing with ten teams in two conferences spread across the midwestern and western United States, the league's regular season kicked off on February 16, 2017, when the Salt Lake Screaming Eagles hosted the Nebraska Danger. The regular season ended 18 weeks later on June 18, 2017, with the defending league champion Sioux Falls Storm visiting the Iowa Barnstormers and the Wichita Falls Nighthawks visiting the Nebraska Danger.  The playoffs were held in two rounds, with the top two seeds in each conference playing against each other in the conference championships. The winner of those games met in the United Bowl.

Teams
For 2017, the IFL maintained its two-conference, no-divisions format, with each of the ten teams playing 16 games during the 18-week regular season.  The Billings Wolves and Tri-Cities Fever announced their suspension of operations for the 2017 season, maintaining hope of a return for 2018.  In their place, the Salt Lake Screaming Eagles (owned by Project FANchise, with fans controlling every aspect of the team) were accepted into the IFL as an expansion team, and the Arizona Rattlers joined the IFL after having played the last 24 seasons in the Arena Football League.

Standings

Playoffs

Awards

Players of the week
The following were named the top performers during the 2017 season:

Individual season awards

1st Team All-IFL

2nd Team All-IFL

References

See also 
2017 National Arena League season